Noel Paul Quinn (born 13 January 1962) is a British banking businessman who has been the chief executive (CEO) of HSBC since March 2020, having succeeded John Flint. He initially assumed the role on an interim basis in August 2019.

Early life
Quinn was educated at Birmingham Polytechnic. He then trained as a chartered accountant with Grant Thornton.

Career
Prior to becoming Group Chief Executive, Quinn was chief executive of HSBC’s Global Commercial Banking division from December 2015. He became a group managing director in September 2016.  From 2011 to 2015 Quinn was Regional Head of Commercial Banking for Asia-Pacific, based in Hong Kong.

Quinn joined Forward Trust Group, a subsidiary of Midland Bank, in 1987. Midland Bank was acquired by HSBC in 1992. He led HSBC’s acquisitions of Swan National Motor Finance and Eversholt Leasing Ltd, becoming general manager of each business in turn. 

He has since served as Head of Specialised and Equity Finance at HSBC, Group Director of Strategy & Development at HSBC Insurance Services North America, Head of Commercial Finance Europe, and Head of Commercial Banking UK (2008-2011).

Personal life
Quinn is married, with three adult children, and lives in Surrey.

References

Living people
English bankers
English chief executives
English financial businesspeople
HSBC people
Alumni of Birmingham City University
1962 births